Duchies in Sweden have been allotted since the 13th century to powerful Swedes, almost always to princes of Sweden (only in some of the dynasties) and wives of the latter. From the beginning these duchies were often centers of regional power, where their dukes and duchesses had considerable executive authority of their own, under the central power of their kings or queens regnant. Since the reign of King Gustav III the titles have practically been nominal, with which their bearers only rarely have enjoyed any ducal authority, though often maintaining specially selected leisure residences in their provinces and some limited measure of cultural attachment to them.

Today

In Sweden today, Duke (hertig) is considered a dynastical title, and is only given to members of the Royal House (currently Bernadotte). Unlike British dukedoms, for example, these Swedish titles are not hereditary. Modern Swedish duchies have always been named for the historical provinces of Sweden, which are no longer governmental entities. Currently, there are eleven such duchies one of which includes two of the provinces:

 The Duchess and Duke of Västergötland (Crown Princess Victoria and Prince Daniel)
 The Duchess of Östergötland (Princess Estelle)
 The Duke of Skåne (Prince Oscar)
 The Duke and Duchess of Värmland (Prince Carl Philip and Princess Sofia)
 The Duke of Södermanland (Prince Alexander)
 The Duke of Dalarna (Prince Gabriel)
 The Duke of Halland (Prince Julian)
 The Duchess of Hälsingland and Gästrikland (Princess Madeleine)
 The Duchess of Gotland (Princess Leonore)
 The Duke of Ångermanland (Prince Nicolas)
 The Duchess of Blekinge (Princess Adrienne)

The titles today are given to, and kept by, legitimate members of the Swedish royal family for life, except for Swedish monarchs, who do not continue to hold ducal titles after ascending the throne. Only in connection with his ascension in 1973 has the current king occasionally been referred to as King of Sweden and  Duke of Jämtland. He became the Duke of Jämtland after his christening, and held that title until his ascension to the Swedish throne in 1973. However, his wife, current Queen Silvia, whom he married in 1976, is not a duchess, and no other queen consorts have ever continued to have any such title either, after their husbands became King. Otherwise, royal spouses of ducal title holders are also created dukes and duchesses upon marriage (this would not include spouses who do not become Swedish royalty, such as those who married former dukes who had given up their titles for unapproved marriages). The first example of a man acquiring the Swedish ducal title of a woman was at the 2010 marriage of Crown Princess Victoria to Prince Daniel. Currently the prerequisite for a ducal title has been assumed by the public to be the position of Prince or Princess of Sweden, and for that being a Swedish citizen, however no definite policy has been published.

History

The first use in Swedish of the title of hertig was in 1266 by Prince Magnus, son of Princess Ingeborg and Birger Jarl. That title (derived from German "herzog") then replaced the older Nordic "jarl", both translated into the Latin title dux, However, professor of art history Jan Svanberg is of the opinion that since Birger Jarl (died 1266) was depicted with a ducal coronet of English and continental European design, he actually was a duke, and that his Latin title of Dux Sueorum should be given as Duke and Regent of Sweden in English. Svanberg's opinion would then make duchesses of both of Birger's wives Ingeborg (died 1254) and Matilda (died 1288), in English usage.

From the 13th century and until 1618, in some Swedish royal houses, when a king had more than one son, he gave each or some of them duchies to rule as fiefs. The geography of these duchies could be unclear, as they were not always within the boundaries of one province and could also be reallotted with territorial changes. Feuds between a king and ducal brothers were common, and ended at times in assassination and fratricide. There was only one non-royal Swedish duke, Benedict, Duke of Halland and Finland.

After the Kalmar Union period, just before his death in 1560, King Gustav I continued the tradition by making his sons John, Magnus and Carl powerful dukes, together ruling much more of the kingdom than their older half-brother Eric, who had held a duchy in the southeast. When Eric became King Eric XIV, the imbalance of power his father had created became destructive. John, with the aid of Carl, eventually revolted, dethroned Eric and became king; Magnus proved unimportant due to mental health issues, but Carl's duchy of Södermanland prospered as a separate territory for several decades and also made his eventual rise to the throne possible. His duchy was inherited by his younger son, Carl Philip, who died in 1622 having been the last holder of one of the semi-autonomous Swedish duchies, which his brother, King Gustav II Adolph, officially abolished in 1618.

During the subsequent rule of Queen Christina of Sweden, however, her cousin and heir Carl Gustav of the Palatinate-Zweibrücken was titled Duke of Öland by the Swedish sovereign herself, but her government refused to acknowledge that title officially. His father was created Duke of Stegeborg in 1651, a title that a younger brother of Carl Gustav's eventually inherited.

In 1772, King Gustav III reinstated the appointment of dukes, now non-hereditary, for his brothers as courtesy titles, which added to their international prestige and domestic influence. Since then, all Swedish princes have been created dukes of a province at birth, as well as one Great Prince or Grand Duke of Finland (who died in infancy). During the 20th century, because of constitutional restraints, several princes gave up their royal titles for marriages that were not approved by the King (see Bernadotte af Wisborg). Whether or not they then actually lost their ducal titles too has never been formally or legally determined.

For the first time since the 14th century a princess of Sweden was created duchess in her own right in 1980, coinciding with the amendment of the Act of Succession allowing female succession to the throne. Thus, King Carl XVI Gustaf's eldest daughter Victoria became Crown Princess (displacing her younger brother Carl Philip) and received the title of Duchess of Västergötland. Her younger sister Madeleine was the first princess to be created duchess at birth, and also the first to get a double duchy (see above), roughly corresponding with the modern governmental limits of Gävleborg County. Such modern ducal titles are handled by the King of Sweden personally, are unregulated by law and not registered as names in the Swedish Tax Agency's population census.

Now the title holders are mainly known domestically as Crown Princess Victoria, Prince Daniel, Princess Estelle, Prince Oscar, Prince Carl Philip, Princess Sofia, Prince Alexander, Prince Gabriel, Prince Julian, Princess Madeleine, Princess Leonore, Prince Nicolas and Princess Adrienne though the ducal titles often are included in formal communication and royal court usage. In writing to them, it is considered correct to address all of them but the Crown Princess by ducal title. As of 1772, the dukes and duchesses do not normally reside permanently within their duchies, though they are associated with them to some extent by making occasional visits, seen as beneficial to public relations for the County Administrative Boards and local business.

List of dukes and duchesses by duchy in Sweden
Since Magnus III of Sweden was the first bearer of the Swedish title hertig, this list begins, in the chronological aspect, with him.

This list of dukes and duchesses in Sweden excludes minor duchies (individual towns, manors, mines, estates) as well as dominions such as Estonia and Bremen-Verden. For ease of reference, most provinces are listed by their modern Swedish names with Latin or English exonyms, by which many past dukes have been known, given as alternatives. Years given are those during which ducal titles incontestably were held, regardless of subsequent status as monarchs or former royalty. Since the accession of Charles XIII in 1809, the Royal Court of Sweden has neither recognized that ducal titles are continued to be borne by kings, nor that those were still valid that had been given to princes who subsequently lost their royal status (also see Sigvard Bernadotte). There is also no evidence that domestic provincial ducal titles continued to be borne by kings in earlier eras.

Sweden and Swealand (Dux Sueorum as hertig)

Ångermanland also known as Angermannia

Blekinge also known as Blekingia

Dalarna also known as Dalecarlia

Dalsland also known as Dalia

East Gothland: see Östergötland

Eyland: see Öland

Finland 

From the reign of Gustavus Adolphus, Grand duke of Finland was a part of the official titles of the king of Sweden until the Treaty of Fredrikshamn in 1809.

Gotland also known as Gothland

Queen Desideria (1777-1860) was also known outside of Sweden as Countess of Gotland.

Gästrikland also known as Gestricland

Halland also known as Hallandia

Hälsingland also known as Helsingia

Jämtland also known as Iemptia

Närke also known as Nericia

Saint Bridget (1303-1373) was also known outside of Sweden as Princess of Nericia.

North Halland: see Halland

Öland also known as Eyland

Östergötland also known as East Gothland

Skåne also known as Scania

Småland also known as Small Lands and the Smallands

Södermanland also known as Southmanland and Sudermania

South Halland: see Halland

Stegeborg

Uppland also known as Upland

Värmland also known as Vermelandia and Wermelandia

Västmanland also known as Westmania

Västerbotten also known as West Bothnia

Västergötland also known as West Gothland

 Note: For duchies that begin with Å and Ö see A and O above

Non-ducal provinces

Five of Sweden's 25 modern provinces are not listed above because as yet (2022) they have never had any dukes or duchesses:

Bohuslän also known as Bahusia
Härjedalen also known as Heriedalia
Lapland also known as Laponia and since 1809 as Swedish Lappland  - (two extramarital sons of King Oscar I were unofficially called Princes of Lapland)
Medelpad also known as Medelpadia
Norrbotten also known as North Bothnia

See also
Duke of Estonia
Duke of Finland
Duke of Halland

Footnotes

References
Main reference as of 2010-12-12: Bonniers konversationslexikon encyclopaedia, Stockholm 1949, pp. 884–885
 Fredrik Fryxell as per Svenskt biografiskt lexikon below pdf here

Swedish monarchy
 
 
Sweden